My Happiness may refer to:
My Happiness (album), 2014 album by Amanda Lear
"My Happiness" (1948 song), a 1948 song written by Betty Peterson Blasco and Borney Bergantine
"My Happiness" (Powderfinger song) (2000)
"My Happiness", a song by Daniel O'Donnell from Together Again (2007)
Счастье моё, 2010 Russian language film released as My Happiness or My Joy